St. Catherine's Hill is a chalk downland hill and  biological Site of Special Scientific Interest on the outskirts of Winchester in Hampshire. It is owned by Winchester College but open to the public. It is managed by Hampshire and Isle of Wight Wildlife Trust, and most of it is an Iron Age hillfort, which is a Scheduled Monument.

History 

The top of the hill is ringed by the ramparts of an Iron Age hill fort. In the centre a copse of beech trees contains the site of the 12th-century chapel of St. Catherine. There is also a mizmaze, probably cut between 1647 and 1710.

The hill was cut off from the Itchen water meadows for over a hundred years by the construction of the Didcot, Newbury and Southampton Railway in the 1890s and the Winchester By-pass (A33) in the 1930s. The railway closed in the 1960s and the road was removed following construction of the M3 motorway to the east through Twyford Down in the 1990s. Whilst this reunited the hill with its historic setting to the west, it is now largely cut off from the hills to the east. The routing of the original by-pass to the east of Winchester had been controversial and its replacement by the M3 led to a large-scale protest (see main article Twyford Down protest).

The hill was where the game of Winchester College football was played after being moved from Kingsgate Street and before moving to its modern form on pitches around the school. In 1922, money raised by The Old Wykehamist Lodge of Freemasons hosting the Public Schools Lodge's Council Festival was used to buy the hill and donate it to the college.

Winchester College pupils and teachers assemble twice a year, early in the morning, on top of the hill in one of its customs, "Morning Hills"; this is the only regular whole-school assembly practised by the college.

Geology

Structurally, St. Catherine's Hill is part of the Winchester anticline. This is an upfold in the chalk at the western end of the South Downs. In the Winchester area the core of the anticline has eroded to expose older rocks in Chilcomb, Bar End and Winchester itself, leaving a near complete ring of inward-facing chalk scarp slopes including Magdalen (Morn) Hill to the north, Chilcomb Down and Telegraph Hill to the east, Deacon Hill, Twyford Down and St. Catherine's to the south and Oliver's Battery to the west. Both date from the Turonian stage of the Upper Cretaceous. St. Catherine's Hill is separated from the higher Twyford Down by the dramatic dry valley known as Plague Pits Valley to the east and south, and truncated by the valley of the River Itchen to the west.

References

Hampshire and Isle of Wight Wildlife Trust
Winchester
Hills of Hampshire
Sites of Special Scientific Interest in Hampshire
Hill forts in Hampshire
Nature reserves in Hampshire
Winchester College
Scheduled monuments in Hampshire